Hubertus Balthazar "Bart" Zoet (20 October 1942 – 13 May 1992) was a Dutch cyclist who was active between 1961 and 1969. He competed at the 1964 Summer Olympics and won the gold medal in the 100 km team time trial, alongside Gerben Karstens, Evert Dolman, and Jan Pieterse; he finished 20th in the individual road race. Next year he won the Grote 1-MeiPrijs.

Zoet died of a heart attack, which was induced by depression, alcoholism and hereditary heart disease.

See also
 List of Dutch Olympic cyclists

References

1942 births
1992 deaths
People from Teylingen
Dutch male cyclists
Cyclists at the 1964 Summer Olympics
Olympic cyclists of the Netherlands
Olympic gold medalists for the Netherlands
Olympic medalists in cycling
Medalists at the 1964 Summer Olympics
Cyclists from South Holland
20th-century Dutch people